Maynard may refer to:

Names
 Maynard (given name)
 Maynard (surname)

Places
Canada
 Maynard, Ontario, a village in Augusta Township

United States
 Maynard, Arkansas
 Maynard, Iowa
 Maynard, Kentucky
 Maynard, Massachusetts
 Maynard, Minnesota
 Maynard, Ohio

Other uses
 Maynard (album), by Maynard Ferguson, 1981
 Maynard (software), a shell for Weston competing with the GNOME Shell
 Maynard Electronics, an American company that manufactured tape drives in the 1990s
 The Maynard School, a girls' school in Exeter, UK
 Maynard tape primer, a system for reloading muskets
 Maynards, a sweets manufacturer in the United Kingdom

See also
 Justice Maynard (disambiguation)
 Maynard v. Cartwright, a 1988 United States Supreme Court case